The 1986–87 NBA season was the Bullets 26th season in the NBA and their 14th season in the city of Washington, D.C.

Draft picks

Roster

Regular season

Season standings

Notes
 z, y – division champions
 x – clinched playoff spot

Record vs. opponents

Game log

Regular season

|- align="center" bgcolor="#ffcccc"
| 1
| October 31
| @ Boston
| L 102–120
|
|
|
| Boston Garden
| 0–1

|- align="center" bgcolor="#ffcccc"
| 2
| November 1
| @ Cleveland
| L 106–113
|
|
|
| Richfield Coliseum
| 0–2
|- align="center" bgcolor="#ccffcc"
| 3
| November 4
| New Jersey
| W 102–101
|
|
|
| Capital Centre
| 1–2
|- align="center" bgcolor="#ffcccc"
| 4
| November 5
| @ Detroit
| L 96–97
|
|
|
| Pontiac Silverdome
| 1–3
|- align="center" bgcolor="#ffcccc"
| 5
| November 7
| Boston
| L 86–88
|
|
|
| Capital Centre
| 1–4
|- align="center" bgcolor="#ffcccc"
| 6
| November 8
| @ Atlanta
| L 91–110
|
|
|
| The Omni
| 1–5
|- align="center" bgcolor="#ccffcc"
| 7
| November 12
| Chicago
| W 101–99
|
|
|
| Capital Centre
| 2–5
|- align="center" bgcolor="#ffcccc"
| 8
| November 15
| @ New York
| L 97–104
|
|
|
| Madison Square Garden
| 2–6
|- align="center" bgcolor="#ccffcc"
| 9
| November 16
| Indiana
| W 124–111
|
|
|
| Capital Centre
| 3–6
|- align="center" bgcolor="#ccffcc"
| 10
| November 19
| Detroit
| W 119–105
|
|
|
| Capital Centre
| 4–6
|- align="center" bgcolor="#ccffcc"
| 11
| November 21
| Houston
| W 115–99
|
|
|
| Capital Centre
| 5–6
|- align="center" bgcolor="#ffcccc"
| 12
| November 22
| @ Chicago
| L 84–93
|
|
|
| Chicago Stadium
| 5–7
|- align="center" bgcolor="#ccffcc"
| 13
| November 25
| Portland
| W 111–99
|
|
|
| Capital Centre
| 6–7
|- align="center" bgcolor="#ffcccc"
| 14
| November 26
| @ Milwaukee
| L 103–122
|
|
|
| MECCA Arena
| 6–8
|- align="center" bgcolor="#ccffcc"
| 15
| November 29
| San Antonio
| W 116–103
|
|
|
| Capital Centre
| 7–8

|- align="center" bgcolor="#ccffcc"
| 16
| December 2
| @ Boston
| W 117–109
|
|
|
| Hartford Civic Center
| 8–8
|- align="center" bgcolor="#ffcccc"
| 17
| December 3
| @ Indiana
| L 103–116
|
|
|
| Market Square Arena
| 8–9
|- align="center" bgcolor="#ffcccc"
| 18
| December 5
| Milwaukee
| L 87–91
|
|
|
| Capital Centre
| 8–10
|- align="center" bgcolor="#ccffcc"
| 19
| December 10
| New York
| W 106–105
|
|
|
| Capital Centre
| 9–10
|- align="center" bgcolor="#ccffcc"
| 20
| December 12
| @ Detroit
| W 116–115
|
|
|
| Pontiac Silverdome
| 10–10
|- align="center" bgcolor="#ffcccc"
| 21
| December 13
| Boston
| L 98–105
|
|
|
| Capital Centre
| 10–11
|- align="center" bgcolor="#ffcccc"
| 22
| December 16
| Utah
| L 106–109
|
|
|
| Capital Centre
| 10–12
|- align="center" bgcolor="#ccffcc"
| 23
| December 18
| @ Golden State
| W 128–110
|
|
|
| Oakland–Alameda County Coliseum Arena
| 11–12
|- align="center" bgcolor="#ccffcc"
| 24
| December 20
| @ L.A. Clippers
| W 113–101
|
|
|
| Los Angeles Memorial Sports Arena
| 12–12
|- align="center" bgcolor="#ffcccc"
| 25
| December 21
| @ Portland
| L 101–128
|
|
|
| Memorial Coliseum
| 12–13
|- align="center" bgcolor="#ccffcc"
| 26
| December 25
| @ Philadelphia
| W 102–97
|
|
|
| The Spectrum
| 13–13
|- align="center" bgcolor="#ffcccc"
| 27
| December 27
| Detroit
| L 105–107
|
|
|
| Capital Centre
| 13–14
|- align="center" bgcolor="#ccffcc"
| 28
| December 29
| Golden State
| W 125–105
|
|
|
| Capital Centre
| 14–14
|- align="center" bgcolor="#ffcccc"
| 29
| December 30
| @ New York
| L 97–103
|
|
|
| Madison Square Garden
| 14–15

|- align="center" bgcolor="#ffcccc"
| 30
| January 2
| Atlanta
| L 101–118
|
|
|
| Capital Centre
| 14–16
|- align="center" bgcolor="#ccffcc"
| 31
| January 6
| L.A. Clippers
| W 112–97
|
|
|
| Capital Centre
| 15–16
|- align="center" bgcolor="#ffcccc"
| 32
| January 7
| @ New Jersey
| L 96–118
|
|
|
| Brendan Byrne Arena
| 15–17
|- align="center" bgcolor="#ccffcc"
| 33
| January 9
| @ Milwaukee
| W 100–92
|
|
|
| MECCA Arena
| 16–17
|- align="center" bgcolor="#ccffcc"
| 34
| January 10
| Philadelphia
| W 117–111
|
|
|
| Capital Centre
| 17–17
|- align="center" bgcolor="#ccffcc"
| 35
| January 12
| Sacramento
| W 113–109
|
|
|
| Capital Centre
| 18–17
|- align="center" bgcolor="#ccffcc"
| 36
| January 14
| New Jersey
| W 118–100
|
|
|
| Capital Centre
| 19–17
|- align="center" bgcolor="#ffcccc"
| 37
| January 15
| @ Indiana
| L 105–113
|
|
|
| Market Square Arena
| 19–18
|- align="center" bgcolor="#ffcccc"
| 38
| January 18
| L.A. Lakers
| L 101–115
|
|
|
| Capital Centre
| 19–19
|- align="center" bgcolor="#ccffcc"
| 39
| January 23
| Phoenix
| W 109–90
|
|
|
| Capital Centre
| 20–19
|- align="center" bgcolor="#ffcccc"
| 40
| January 24
| @ Houston
| L 92–115
|
|
|
| The Summit
| 20–20
|- align="center" bgcolor="#ccffcc"
| 41
| January 27
| @ Dallas
| W 118–113
|
|
|
| Reunion Arena
| 21–20
|- align="center" bgcolor="#ffcccc"
| 42
| January 29
| @ Detroit
| L 101–112
|
|
|
| Pontiac Silverdome
| 21–21
|- align="center" bgcolor="#ccffcc"
| 43
| January 31
| Philadelphia
| W 106–105
|
|
|
| Capital Centre
| 22–21

|- align="center" bgcolor="#ccffcc"
| 44
| February 2
| New York
| W 104–98
|
|
|
| Capital Centre
| 23–21
|- align="center" bgcolor="#ffcccc"
| 45
| February 3
| @ Chicago
| L 91–98
|
|
|
| Chicago Stadium
| 23–22
|- align="center" bgcolor="#ccffcc"
| 46
| February 5
| Cleveland
| W 94–85
|
|
|
| Capital Centre
| 24–22
|- align="center" bgcolor="#ccffcc"
| 47
| February 11
| @ San Antonio
| W 133–108
|
|
|
| HemisFair Arena
| 25–22
|- align="center" bgcolor="#ccffcc"
| 48
| February 12
| @ Denver
| W 121–115
|
|
|
| McNichols Sports Arena
| 26–22
|- align="center" bgcolor="#ffcccc"
| 49
| February 14
| @ Sacramento
| L 111–136
|
|
|
| ARCO Arena
| 26–23
|- align="center" bgcolor="#ccffcc"
| 50
| February 16
| @ Phoenix
| W 124–110
|
|
|
| Arizona Veterans Memorial Coliseum
| 27–23
|- align="center" bgcolor="#ccffcc"
| 51
| February 17
| @ L.A. Lakers
| W 114–99
|
|
|
| The Forum
| 28–23
|- align="center" bgcolor="#ccffcc"
| 52
| February 20
| @ Utah
| W 118–113
|
|
|
| Salt Palace
| 29–23
|- align="center" bgcolor="#ffcccc"
| 53
| February 21
| @ Seattle
| L 93–110
|
|
|
| Seattle Center Coliseum
| 29–24
|- align="center" bgcolor="#ffcccc"
| 54
| February 23
| @ Cleveland
| L 105–109
|
|
|
| Richfield Coliseum
| 29–25
|- align="center" bgcolor="#ccffcc"
| 55
| February 26
| Indiana
| W 100–94
|
|
|
| Capital Centre
| 30–25
|- align="center" bgcolor="#ccffcc"
| 56
| February 28
| New York
| W 106–105
|
|
|
| Capital Centre
| 31–25

|- align="center" bgcolor="#ffcccc"
| 57
| March 2
| @ Atlanta
| L 99–121
|
|
|
| The Omni
| 31–26
|- align="center" bgcolor="#ccffcc"
| 58
| March 4
| New Jersey
| W 117–114
|
|
|
| Capital Centre
| 32–26
|- align="center" bgcolor="#ffcccc"
| 59
| March 6
| @ Philadelphia
| L 113–123
|
|
|
| The Spectrum
| 32–27
|- align="center" bgcolor="#ffcccc"
| 60
| March 10
| @ New Jersey
| L 79–121
|
|
|
| Brendan Byrne Arena
| 32–28
|- align="center" bgcolor="#ffcccc"
| 61
| March 11
| Milwaukee
| L 107–115
|
|
|
| Capital Centre
| 32–29
|- align="center" bgcolor="#ccffcc"
| 62
| March 14
| Chicago
| W 106–105 (OT)
|
|
|
| Capital Centre
| 33–29
|- align="center" bgcolor="#ccffcc"
| 63
| March 15
| Cleveland
| W 97–89
|
|
|
| Capital Centre
| 34–29
|- align="center" bgcolor="#ffcccc"
| 64
| March 17
| @ Atlanta
| L 98–118
|
|
|
| The Omni
| 34–30
|- align="center" bgcolor="#ccffcc"
| 65
| March 19
| Seattle
| W 110–106
|
|
|
| Capital Centre
| 35–30
|- align="center" bgcolor="#ffcccc"
| 66
| March 21
| Denver
| L 107–117
|
|
|
| Capital Centre
| 35–31
|- align="center" bgcolor="#ffcccc"
| 67
| March 23
| @ Indiana
| L 92–101
|
|
|
| Market Square Arena
| 35–32
|- align="center" bgcolor="#ffcccc"
| 68
| March 24
| Atlanta
| L 87–96
|
|
|
| Capital Centre
| 35–33
|- align="center" bgcolor="#ccffcc"
| 69
| March 26
| Boston
| W 106–103
|
|
|
| Capital Centre
| 36–33
|- align="center" bgcolor="#ffcccc"
| 70
| March 28
| Dallas
| L 107–114
|
|
|
| Capital Centre
| 36–34
|- align="center" bgcolor="#ffcccc"
| 71
| March 31
| @ Chicago
| L 75–101
|
|
|
| Chicago Stadium
| 36–35

|- align="center" bgcolor="#ffcccc"
| 72
| April 1
| @ Boston
| L 86–103
|
|
|
| Boston Garden
| 36–36
|- align="center" bgcolor="#ccffcc"
| 73
| April 3
| Chicago
| W 122–118
|
|
|
| Capital Centre
| 37–36
|- align="center" bgcolor="#ccffcc"
| 74
| April 4
| @ Cleveland
| W 127–111
|
|
|
| Richfield Coliseum
| 38–36
|- align="center" bgcolor="#ffcccc"
| 75
| April 7
| Milwaukee
| L 94–95
|
|
|
| Capital Centre
| 38–37
|- align="center" bgcolor="#ccffcc"
| 76
| April 8
| @ New Jersey
| W 118–109
|
|
|
| Brendan Byrne Arena
| 39–37
|- align="center" bgcolor="#ffcccc"
| 77
| April 10
| Indiana
| L 101–115
|
|
|
| Capital Centre
| 39–38
|- align="center" bgcolor="#ccffcc"
| 78
| April 12
| Detroit
| W 103–98
|
|
|
| Capital Centre
| 40–38
|- align="center" bgcolor="#ccffcc"
| 79
| April 13
| @ Philadelphia
| L 105–113
|
|
|
| The Spectrum
| 40–39
|- align="center" bgcolor="#ccffcc"
| 80
| April 15
| Cleveland
| W 110–101
|
|
|
| Capital Centre
| 41–39
|- align="center" bgcolor="#ccffcc"
| 81
| April 17
| @ New York
| W 142–110
|
|
|
| Madison Square Garden
| 42–39
|- align="center" bgcolor="#ffcccc"
| 82
| April 19
| Philadelphia
| L 102–108
|
|
|
| Capital Centre
| 42–40

Playoffs

|- align="center" bgcolor="#ffcccc"
| 1
| April 24
| @ Detroit
| L 92–106
| Terry Catledge (24)
| Malone, Catledge (12)
| Moses Malone (3)
| Pontiac Silverdome15,419
| 0–1
|- align="center" bgcolor="#ffcccc"
| 2
| April 26
| @ Detroit
| L 85–128
| Terry Catledge (19)
| Moses Malone (10)
| Ennis Whatley (4)
| Pontiac Silverdome14,389
| 0–2
|- align="center" bgcolor="#ffcccc"
| 3
| April 29
| Detroit
| L 96–97
| Moses Malone (31)
| Moses Malone (16)
| Michael Adams (8)
| Capital Centre10,831
| 0–3
|-

Player statistics

Season

Playoffs

Awards and records
 Moses Malone, All-NBA Second Team

Transactions

References

See also
 1986-87 NBA season

Washington Wizards seasons
Wash
Washing
Washing